X95 may refer to:
IWI X95, an Israeli bullpup assault rifle
Diego Jiménez Torres Airport in Fajardo, Puerto Rico (FAA LID: X95)